List of Icelandic language poets is a list of poets that write or have written in the Icelandic language, either in Old Norse or a more modern form of Icelandic. Hence the list includes a few Norwegians and an earl of the Orkney Islands. The names given are usually each poet's first name and patronym, unless he or she is better known by a nickname or a chosen pen name. All names are given in their Modern Icelandic form.

 Bragi Boddason (fl. 9th century) Bragi inn gamli Boddason (Norwegian)
 Þjóðólfur úr Hvini (fl. 9th century) (Norwegian)
 Þorbjörn hornklofi (fl. 9th century) (Norwegian)
 Egill Skalla-Grímsson (c. 910 – c. 990)
 Eyvindur skáldaspillir (fl. 10th century) Eyvindur Finnsson (Norwegian)
 Kormákur Ögmundarson (fl. 10th century)
 Einar skálaglamm (fl. 10th century) Einar Helgason
 Gunnlaugur ormstunga (c. 983 – c. 1008) Gunnlaugur Illugason
 Hallfreður vandræðaskáld (fl. 10th – 11th centuries) Hallfreður Óttarsson
 Sighvatur Þórðarson  (fl. 11th century)
 Þórarinn loftunga (fl. 11th century)
 Arnór jarlaskáld (fl. 11th century) Arnór Þórðarson
 Rögnvaldur Kolsson (died 1158) Rögnvaldur jarl kali (from Orkney)
 Einar Skúlason (fl. 12th century)
 Kolbeinn Tumason (died 1208)
 Snorri Sturluson (1179 – 1241)
 Þórir Steinfinnsson (died 1238) Þórir jökull 
 Ólafur hvítaskáld (died 1259) Ólafur Þórðarson
 Sturla Þórðarson (1214 – 1284)
 Eysteinn Ásgrímsson (died 1360)
 Jón Arason (1484 – 1550)
 Magnús Jónsson (died 1595) Magnús prúði
 Jón Bjarnason (c. 1560 – after 1630)
 Ólafur Jónsson (c. 1560 – 1627)
 Hallgrímur Pétursson (1614 – 1674)
 Steinunn Finnsdóttir (c. 1640 – c. 1710)
 Eggert Ólafsson (1726 – 1768)
 Bjarni Thorarensen (1786 – 1841)
 Sveinbjörn Egilsson (1791 – 1852)
 Bólu-Hjálmar (1796 – 1875) Hjálmar Jónsson
 Sigurður Breiðfjörð (1798 – 1846)
 Jónas Hallgrímsson (1807 – 1845)
 Jón Thoroddsen (1818 – 1868)
 Grímur Thomsen (1820 – 1896)
 Páll Ólafsson (1827 – 1905)
 Steingrímur Thorsteinsson (1831 – 1913)
 Matthías Jochumsson (1835 – 1920)
 Stephan G. Stephansson (1853 – 1927) Stefán Guðmundur Guðmundsson
 Þorsteinn Erlingsson (1858 – 1914)
 Kristjan Niels Julius (1860 – 1936) Káinn (usually), K. N. (sometimes) or K. N. Julius (seldom)
 Hannes Hafstein (1861 – 1922)
 Einar Benediktsson (1864 – 1940)
 Jóhann Sigurjónsson (1880 – 1919)
 Hulda (1881 – 1947) Unnur Benediktsdóttir Bjarklind
 Davíð Stefánsson (1895 – 1964)
 Jóhannes úr Kötlum (1899 – 1972) Jóhannes Jónasson
 Jón Helgason
 Tómas Guðmundsson (1901 – 1983)
 Þórbergur Þórðarson (1889 – 1974)
 Halldór Laxness (1902 – 1998) Halldór Kiljan Laxness, Halldór Guðjónsson
 Steinn Steinarr (1908 – 1958) Aðalsteinn Kristmundsson
 Kristján Eldjárn (1916 – 1982)
 Sveinbjörn Beinteinsson (1924 – 1993) Sveinbjörn allsherjargoði
 Sigfús Daðason (1928 – 1996)
 Þórarinn Eldjárn (born 1949)
 Þórdís Gísladóttir (born 1965)
 Valdimar Tómasson (born 1971)

Iceland
 
Poets
Poets